The 1996 United States presidential election in Alaska took place on November 7, 1996, as part of the 1996 United States presidential election. Voters chose representatives, or electors to the Electoral College, who voted for president and vice president.

Alaska was won by Senator Bob Dole (R-KS), with Dole winning 50.80% to 33.27% over President Bill Clinton (D) by a margin of 17.53%. Billionaire businessman Ross Perot (Reform-TX) finished in third, with 10.9% of the popular vote.

With 50.8% of the popular vote, Alaska proved to be Dole's fifth strongest state in the 1996 election after Utah, Kansas, Nebraska and Idaho. This was the first time since 1964 that Lake and Peninsula Borough voted Democratic.

Results

See also
United States presidential elections in Alaska

References

President
Alaska
1996